is a subway station on the  Fukuoka City Subway Nanakuma Line in Chūō-ku, Fukuoka in Japan. Its station symbol is a picture of a pine in green. Ropponmatsu means "six pines" in Japanese.

Lines

Platforms

Vicinity
Route 202
McDonald's
Subway
Seattle's Best Coffee
Befu Bridge (Hii River)
Kyushu University Ropponmatsu Campus
Nishitetsu bus stop
Lawson
Nishi-Nippon City Bank Ropponmatsu branch office
Fukuoka Prefecture Gokoku Shrine
NHK Fukuoka broadcasting station
Fukuoka Meteorological Observatory
Ōhori Park
Ōhori Junior High School and High School Attached to  Fukuoka University

History
February 3, 2005: Opening of the station

References

Railway stations in Japan opened in 2005
Railway stations in Fukuoka Prefecture
Nanakuma Line